SoaML (Service-oriented architecture Modeling Language ) is an open source specification project from the Object Management Group (OMG), describing a UML profile and metamodel for the modeling and design of services within a service-oriented architecture.

Description
SoaML has been created to support the following modeling capabilities:
 Identifying services, dependencies between them and services requirements
 Specifying services (functional capabilities, consumer expectations, the protocols and message exchange patterns)
 Defining service consumers and providers
 The policies for using and providing services
 Services classification schemes
 Integration with OMG Business Motivation Model
 Foundation for further extensions both related to integration with other OMG metamodels like BPDM and BPMN 2.0, as well as SBVR, OSM, ODM and others.

The existing models and meta models (e.g. TOGAF) for describing system architectures turned out to be insufficient to describe SOA in a precise and standardized way. The UML itself seems to be too general for the purpose of describing SOA and needed clarification and standardization of even basic terms like provider, consumer, etc.

See also 
 Systems Modeling Language
 Unified Modeling Language

Further reading 
 SoaML Wiki. "SoaML Wiki". SoaML and OMG, 03 Nov 2009. 
 SoaML OMG Specification http://www.omg.org/spec/SoaML/
 OASIS SOA Reference Model Technical Committee http://www.oasis-open.org/committees/tc_home.php?wg_abbrev=soa-rm

References and notes
Notes

Citations

External articles
 Using SoaML services architecture by Jim Amsden, a co-author of the OMG SoaML standard.
 Modeling with SoaML, the services-oriented architecture modeling language, a five-part series by Jim Amsden.

Unified Modeling Language
Data modeling languages
Specification languages
Service-oriented (business computing)
Enterprise modelling
Modeling languages